HMS Columbia was the United States privateer brig Curlew, which the British Royal Navy captured in 1812 and took into service as HMS Columbia. The Navy sold her in 1820.

Capture
On 24 July 1812  captured the privateer Curlew . Curlew, of 240 tons, was pierced for 18 guns but carried only sixteen, and had a complement of 172 men; She was under the command of Captain William Wyer.

Royal Navy
The Royal Navy took Curlew into service as HMS Columbia. In March 1813 she was under the command of Lieutenant John Kinsman. On 28 May Commander Henry Chads replaced Kinsman. Columbia then brought home a number of invalids from Halifax.

Columbia underwent fitting at Portsmouth between 19 November 1813 and 18 April 1814. She then sailed for the Leeward Islands.

On 4 December 1814 Columbia captured the United States schooner Dolphin, of 62 tons, one gun, and 20 men. Dolphin, under the command of Captain A. Johnson, of Massachusetts, apparently had accomplished little.

Columbia participated in the Invasion of Guadeloupe (1815). On 8 August 1815 Columbia, under the command of Captain Fleming, was part of the British force that captured Guadeloupe from Bonaparte loyalists. French Royalist troops from Martinique, two corvettes, and a schooner assisted the British. Columbia, and  covered the landing of the troops; they helped silence a shore battery and drive the defenders back from the beach. Columbia, and  then supported a third landing on a different part of the island.

Fate
Columbia was paid off and went into Ordinary in November 1815. The Navy sold her there on 13 January 1820.

Notes, citations, and references
Notes

Citations

References
 
 

 
 

1812 ships
Ships built in the United States
Privateer ships of the United States
Captured ships
Brigs of the Royal Navy